The Hyattsville Post Office is a one-story brick building constructed over a full basement, located on Gallatin Street in Hyattsville, Prince George's County, Maryland. The Colonial Revival building consists of a central, three-bay block flanked by smaller one-bay flat-roofed pavilions. It was constructed in 1935 and remains in active use.  Murals by Eugene Kingman, depicting the agricultural heritage of Prince George's County, decorate the lobby. Its design reflects the attention Hyattsville resident and Fourth Assistant Postmaster General Smith W. Purdum paid to its construction.

It was listed on the National Register of Historic Places in 1986.

References

External links
, including undated photo, at Maryland Historical Trust website

Hyattsville Main
Hyattsville, Maryland
Buildings and structures in Prince George's County, Maryland
Government buildings completed in 1935
National Register of Historic Places in Prince George's County, Maryland
Hyattsville
Colonial Revival architecture in Maryland